Colonial era architecture of Makassar in South Sulawesi, Indonesia includes Fort Rotterdam and other Dutch buildings constructed when the area was part for the Dutch East Indies. The city was involved in the spice trade. Makassar came under Dutch control in 1669.

Gallery

See also
Colonial architecture in Indonesia

References

Makassar
Makassar